This is a list of the busiest airports in the Philippines by passenger traffic published by the Civil Aviation Authority of the Philippines. Passenger traffic data includes commercial passengers on domestic and international flights, general aviation flights and military flights.

Note that passenger statistics for only the country's national civilian airports is compiled by the CAAP. Among the 85 national airports, the statistics for airports managed by other government corporations (such as Clark International Airport, managed by the Clark International Airport Corporation; Subic Bay International Airport, managed by the Subic Bay Metropolitan Authority; San Fernando Airport, managed by the Poro Point Management Corporation), as well as other smaller community airports (often unstaffed) are frequently unpublished or simply not recorded. In such cases an em dash ( — ), which the CAAP also uses in its tables, will be used below; note that this does not necessarily indicate a value of 0. Moreover, in some instances the data published by the CAAP pertains to only part of a calendar year. This will be indicated in the tables below, where known. An 'x' indicates that statistics for the airport were not tracked for the year, because the facility is yet to be transferred to CAAP management, has already been transferred to private ownership, or has been closed down.

The CAAP does not compile statistics for private or non-CAAP aerodromes or airfields solely used by the military.

Impact of the COVID-19 pandemic 

Air traffic volumes at airports worldwide dramatically declined in 2020 due to the COVID-19 pandemic, including in the Philippines. The rate at which traffic volumes will recover to pre-pandemic levels will depend on numerous factors, including economic recovery and the easing of domestic and international traffic restrictions, however it is anticipated to take several years.

Graph

Passenger traffic (2021–present)

Passenger traffic (2016–2020)

Passenger traffic (2011–2015)

Passenger traffic (2006–2010)

Passenger traffic (2001–2005)

Notes

References

See also
 List of airports in the Philippines

 
Philippines